John Francis "Jake" Burns (born 17 February 1941) is a former New Zealand rugby union player. A lock, Burns represented Canterbury at a provincial level. He was a member of the New Zealand national side, the All Blacks, on their 1970 tour of South Africa, playing in nine matches but no internationals.

References

1941 births
Living people
Rugby union players from Christchurch
People educated at St Bede's College, Christchurch
New Zealand rugby union players
New Zealand international rugby union players
Canterbury rugby union players
Rugby union locks